Zadębie may refer to the following villages in Poland:
 Zadębie, Lublin County in Lublin Voivodeship (east Poland)
 Zadębie, Parczew County in Lublin Voivodeship (east Poland)
 Zadębie, Grójec County in Masovian Voivodeship (east-central Poland)
 Zadębie, Piaseczno County in Masovian Voivodeship (east-central Poland)
 Zadębie, Pomeranian Voivodeship (north Poland)